North Carolina elected its members August 9, 1827, after the term began but before the new Congress convened.

See also 
 1826 North Carolina's 8th congressional district special election
 1826 and 1827 United States House of Representatives elections
 List of United States representatives from North Carolina

Notes 

1827
North Carolina
United States House of Representatives